is known as the "father of Japanese studies" at Columbia University.  He was directly responsible for developing the Japanese language and literature collection at Columbia's library.   Prominent among the former-students who credit his influence as formative is Donald Keene, who had himself become a later Dean of Japanese studies in the United States.

Biography 
Tsunoda was the youngest of seven children born to a family of peasants in Japan. He studied at Waseda University, and later developed interest in the United States.  

Keene's own perspective on Tsunoda was expressed in a lecture given at Waseda University in 1994:
"His vocation was teaching, not writing. His joy as a teacher lay in communicating knowledge directly and enthusiastically to his students. ... As one of his students, I feel it regrettable that Prof. Tsunoda is not known just because he did not publish anything."

Selected works
In an overview of writings by and about Tsunoda, OCLC/WorldCat lists roughly 50 works in 100+2 publications in 4 languages and 2,000+ library holdings. 
This list is not finished; you can help Wikipedia by adding to it.

 Japan in the Chinese Dynastic Histories, 1951 (with L. Carrington Goodrich) 
 Sources of Japanese Tradition, Vols. I-II, 1958 (with William Theodore de Bary and Donald Keene)

Notes

References
 de Bary, William Theodore. "East Asian Studies at Columbia: The Early Years," Living Legacies: Great Moments and Leading Figures in the History of Columbia University, 2002.
 Shirai, Katsuhiko.  "Take Pride in Waseda," Waseda Weekly, April 2006. Shinjuku, Tokyo: Waseda University.
 Profile at Waseda University

External links
 Waseda University:  "Tsunoda Ryūsaku -- his life as a bridge between Japan and America," 2008.

1877 births
1964 deaths
Columbia University faculty
20th-century Japanese historians
Japanese Japanologists
Waseda University alumni
Japanese emigrants to the United States